Chlorophytum filipendulum is a species of flowering plant in the Asparagaceae family. It is native to a variety of habitats across large areas of Africa.

References 

 Trans. Linn. Soc. London, Bot. 1: 260 1878.
 The Plant List

Agavoideae
Taxa named by John Gilbert Baker